Ernest Bennett may refer to:

 Sir Ernest Bennett (politician) (1865–1947), British politician
 Ernest Bennett (poker player)
 Ernest Bennett (rugby league) (1879–1921), English rugby league footballer
 Ernest Sterndale Bennett (1884–1982), actor and theatre director in Canada